The 2009 Indonesian Community Shield was the inaugural edition of the Indonesian Community Shield. It was a match played by the 2008-09 Indonesia Super League winners Persipura Jayapura and 2008-09 Copa Indonesia winners Sriwijaya FC. It took place on 7 October 2009 at the Andi Mattalatta Stadium in Makassar, Indonesia. Persipura won the match 3–1.

Match details

References

Persipura matches
Sriwijaya F.C. matches
Indonesian Community Shield
2009–10 in Indonesian football